Annandaliella is a genus of tarantulas that was first described by A. S. Hirst in 1909.  it contains three species endemic to India: A. ernakulamensis, A. pectinifera, and A. travancorica. They are selenogyrid tarantulas, meaning they have a stridulating organ on the inner side of the chelicerae.

Diagnosis 
They can be distinguished from other genera by the row of spines found in the inner side of the celicerae found in males, used for stridulation. Their feet of leg 1 is slender, and the division of their tarsal scopula is practically obsolete in males.

See also
 List of Theraphosidae species

References

Theraphosidae genera
Spiders of the Indian subcontinent
Theraphosidae